William Clay Cole (August 29, 1897 – September 23, 1965) was a Republican representative from Missouri's 3rd congressional district from 1943 to 1949 and Missouri's 6th congressional district from 1953 to 1955.

Background

William Clay Cole was born on August 29, 1897, on a farm near Fillmore, Missouri.

Career

In 1916, Cole was a mounted scout on the Mexican border with the Missouri National Guard during the Pancho Villa Expedition and then served in France for 14 months during World War I.

After the war he graduated from St. Joseph Law School (which operated under the auspices of the YMCA in St. Joseph, Missouri from 1912 to 1938).

Cole served in the Missouri House of Representatives from 1942 to 1943, after winning a vacant seat in a special election. In 1942 he was elected to the U.S. House, and served 1943 to 1949. He ran unsuccessfully for reelection in 1948. He ran unsuccessfully in 1950, but won again in 1952, serving one term, 1953 to 1955. He ran unsuccessfully for reelection in 1954.

Cole returned to his law practice in St. Joseph and was a member of the federal Board of Veterans Appeals from 1955 to 1960.

Personal life and death

Cole was a member of the Lions Club, Odd Fellows; Elks Club, Moose Club, Brotherhood of Railroad Trainmen, American Legion, and Veterans of Foreign Wars.

William Clay Cole died age 68 on September 23, 1965, in St. Joseph and was buried at Fillmore Cemetery in Fillmore.

References

External links

1897 births
1965 deaths
People from Andrew County, Missouri
Missouri lawyers
American military personnel of World War I
Republican Party members of the Missouri House of Representatives
Republican Party members of the United States House of Representatives from Missouri
20th-century American politicians
20th-century American lawyers